Myonyssoides is a genus of mites in the family Laelapidae.

Species
 Myonyssoides capensis Hirst, 1925

References

Laelapidae